John Wardle is a Melbourne-based architect.  He graduated from the Royal Melbourne Institute of Technology with a degree in Architecture.

Biography
John Wardle established his architectural practice, John Wardle Architects (JWA), in Melbourne in 1986 and has led the growth of the practice from working on small domestic dwellings to university buildings, museums and large commercial offices.

In 2001 he completed a Master of Architecture at RMIT University, and he was Adjunct Professor at the School of Art, Architecture and Design, University of South Australia (now UniSA Creative, and he is not listed as staff).

Wardle has formed strong links with both artists and public art galleries and, as a practicing architect and board member of both the Anne & Gordon Samstag Museum of Art and the Ian Potter Museum of Art, has contributed to important public art programs.

Projects

Award winning projects by John Wardle Architects include:
 1997 25 William St. Office, Richmond, Melbourne
 1999 RMIT Printing Facility, Brunswick Campus, Melbourne
 2000 Kew Residence, Melbourne
 2002 RMIT Biosciences Building, Bundoora Campus, Melbourne
 2006 Uni SA Kaurna Building, Adelaide
 2008 Nigel Peck Centre for Learning and Leadership, Melbourne
 2008 Hawke Building, Adelaide
 2008 Queensland Brain Institute
 2009 Jane Foss Russell Building, University of Sydney
 2011 Victoria University Learning Commons and Exercise Sports Science Project
 2012 Shearer's Quarters, Bruny Island, Tasmania
 2013 Fairhaven Beach House

2018 & 2020: Somewhere Other

The 2020 Adelaide//International exhibition at the Samstag Museum centred around an installation called Somewhere Other by John Wardle Architects, in collaboration with Natasha Johns-Messenger. It had also been Australia's entry in the 2018 Venice Architecture Biennale.

Due to run from 28 February to 12 June, the exhibition was cut short by the closure of the Samstag in March 2020 owing to the COVID-19 pandemic in Australia.

Awards
In 2002 and 2006, JWA was awarded the Australian Institute of Architects Sir Zelman Cowen Award for the most outstanding work of public architecture in Australia. The practice has also been awarded the Harold Desbrowe-Annear Residential Award on three occasions, the Victorian Architecture Medal for a second time in 2008 and the Esmond Dorney Award for Residential Architecture in 2012. In 2012 the Shearers Quarters received the Robin Boyd Award for Residential Architecture. In 2016 JWA was jointly awarded the Melbourne Prize for the Tanderrum Bridge in collaboration with NADAAA.
Most recently John Wardle was awarded the 2020 Australian Institute of Architecture's Gold Medal.

References

Further reading
 John Wardle Architects, Thames and Hudson, London, 2008

External links 
 

Architects from Melbourne
RMIT University alumni
Living people
Year of birth missing (living people)